Hastings  Methodist Episcopal Church is a church building located at 719 Vermillion Street in downtown Hastings, Minnesota, United States, listed on the National Register of Historic Places.  It is significant for its Gothic Revival, Greek Revival, and Italianate architecture. The building exterior is clapboard with a characteristic tower including abat-sons and emphatic eaves supported by corbels.  It is the oldest church building in Hastings, originally built in 1862 on 5th Street, it was moved to its present location in 1871; at that time the tower was added. The building is currently used by the Life Tabernacle Pentecostal Church.

References

1862 establishments in Minnesota
19th-century Methodist church buildings in the United States
Buildings and structures in Hastings, Minnesota
Churches completed in 1862
Churches in Dakota County, Minnesota
Churches on the National Register of Historic Places in Minnesota
Methodist churches in Minnesota
National Register of Historic Places in Dakota County, Minnesota
Pentecostal churches in Minnesota